The Constitution of the Chinese Communist Party has 53 articles and its contents describe the program of the Party, as well as its organizational structure and Party symbolism.

History 
The Chinese Communist Party (CCP)'s constitution currently in force was adopted at the 12th National Congress of the CCP in September 1982. In accordance with the changing situation and tasks, revisions were made in some of the articles at the 13th National Congress in November 1987 and in the General Program and some of the articles at the 14th National Congress in October 1992, and a few revisions were made in the General Program at the 16th National Congress of the CCP in November 2002.

In March 2004, The "Three Represents" were written into the constitution. New changes and additions were made at CCP's 19th National Congress in October 2017 and at its 20th National Congress in October 2022.

Contents 
The Party Constitution is composed of a preamble titled "General Program", followed by 11 numbered chapters composed of 53 articles. The chapters are, in order:

 Membership
 The Party's Organizational System
 Central Party Organizations
 Local Party Organizations
 Primary-Level Party Organizations
 Party Officials
 Party Discipline
 Party Organs for Discipline Inspection
 Leading Party Member Groups
 Relationship between the Party and the Communist Youth League of China
 Party Emblem and Flag

The organizational principle that drives the political system of the PRC is "democratic centralism". Within the system, the democratic feature demands participation and expression of opinion on key policy issues from members at all levels of party organization. It depends on a constant process of consultation and investigation. At the same time, the centralist feature requires that subordinate organizational levels follow the dictates of superior levels. Once the debate has reached the highest level and decisions concerning policy have been made, all party members are obliged to support the Central Committee.

The constitution emphasizes the party's role in promoting socialist democracy, in developing and strengthening a socialist legal system, and in consolidating public resolve to carry out the modernization program.

See also 

 Chinese Communist Party Admission Oath

References

External links 

 Text of the Constitution of the Chinese Communist Party as of October 22, 2022 
 Text of the Constitution of the Chinese Communist Party as of October 24, 2017 
 Text of the Constitution of the Chinese Communist Party as of October 26, 2022 

Chinese Communist Party
Party platforms